The 2017–18 season was Wycombe Wanderers' 131st season in existence and their 25th consecutive season in the Football League.

Competitions

Pre-season
Wycombe Wanderers announced on 18 April 2017 that they will face AFC Wimbledon during their pre-season run-in. On 26 April 2017, A friendly against Maidenhead United was confirmed. Two days later, the club announced they will play Aldershot Town during pre-season. The Chairboys will kick off pre-season against Slough Town. On 22 June 2017, it was announced that Wycombe Wanderers would play a friendly behind closed doors against Queens Park Rangers Under-23s.

League Two

League table

Results summary

Results by matchday

Matches
The 2017–18 EFL League Two fixtures were released on 21 June 2017.

FA Cup

EFL Cup

On 16 June 2017, Wycombe Wanderers were drawn at home to Fulham in the first round.

EFL Trophy

On 12 July 2017, Wycombe Wanderers were drawn against Bristol Rovers, Swindon Town and West Ham United U23s in Southern Group C.

Team details

Squad information

 Loan player

Appearances and goals

|-
|colspan="14"|Players who left the club before the end of the season:

|}

Transfers

Transfers in

Transfers out

Loans in

Loans out

References

Wycombe Wanderers
Wycombe Wanderers F.C. seasons